Fluxinella stellaris is a species of sea snail, a marine gastropod mollusk in the family Seguenziidae.

Description
The size of the shell varies between 6 mm and 9 mm.

Distribution
This species occurs in the Indian Ocean off Madagascar.

References

External links
 

stellaris
Gastropods described in 2008